Pavlovka is a howardite meteorite fallen in 1882 near a village of Pavlovka, in the western part of modern Saratov Oblast, Russia. It is currently stored in the meteorite collection of the Russian Academy of Sciences.

Notes

See also
Glossary of meteoritics

External links
Meteoritical Bulletin Database

Meteorites found in Russia
Saratov Oblast
1882 in Europe
1882 in science
1882 in the Russian Empire
Asteroidal achondrites